Tenovis (formerly Deutsche Privat Telephon Gesellschaft, Telefonbau und Normalzeit, T&N, Telenorma and Bosch Telecom) was a large German telecommunications company first set up in 1899, who were acquired by Avaya in October 2004.  The business has a staff force of more than 5,400 employees and maintains a presence in Austria, Belgium, France, Italy, Spain, Switzerland and the Netherlands. Tenovis announced its IPO in April 2004. Tenovis has its head office situated in Frankfurt/Main, its main 'Product portfolio' consists of communication solutions, among them being: Private branch exchange, call center, business recovery center (backup computer centers), customer relationship management, voice messaging, cross-linking and services for enterprises and national authorities. The Support leg of the enterprise is a well-developed telephone system of small and medium size subsidiaries.

References

Avaya
Telecommunications companies of Germany
Companies based in Frankfurt
Companies acquired from Jews under Nazi rule